Kashima is the name used by three Japanese ships:

 , a Katori-class pre-dreadnought battleship operated by the Imperial Japanese Navy from 1906 to 1924
 , a Katori-class light cruiser operated by the Imperial Japanese Navy from 1940 until 1947
 , a training vessel operated by the Japan Maritime Self-Defense Force from 1995 to present

See also
Kashima (disambiguation)

Imperial Japanese Navy ship names
Japanese Navy ship names